Keekozhur also spelt as Keekozhoor is a small village on the side of Pamba River, situated 4 km from Ranni and 9 km from Kozhencherry. It is in the state of Kerala, India. It is 15 km from the Pathanamthitta district headquarters. This village is under Ranny and Cherukole Panchayats.

Community life
A hamlet on the bank of River Pamba en route to "Sabarimala", Keekozhur is renowned for its communal harmony, co-operation and social equality. The residents of the village are committed to help each other, emphasizing the principle of "self-help through mutual help". The village possess ancient cultural heritage; Keekozhoor is closely bound to ARANMULA cultural heritage. Keekozhur-Vayalathala Palliyodam is a strong participant in Aranmula Vallamkali (boat race) from its beginning itself.
Folklore temple arts like Padayani and Mudiyttu are performing every year in the ancient Bhadrakali temple @keekozhur during Ulsavam named Pooram there during (Kumbha maasam M.E) Feb_March

Education
Keekozhoor has a Government High School and a Government Lower Primary School
Mar Thoma Lower Primary School at the Eastern Part and a Noel Memorial Upper Primary School under the management of the Brothern Church.

Keekozhoor has one of the first libraries. The Library and Reading room in Keekozhoor provided opportunity for the people to get good books and created in them a habit of reading.

The Noel Memorial Upper Primary School is one of the first educational institutions in the neighboring areas. Though it had the potential of becoming a high school, it still remains as an Upper Primary School.

Demographics
The majority of the people of Keekozhoor belongs to the Christian Community. Major Churches are Indian Pentecostal Church, Full Gospel Church of God, Brethren Church, Malankara Orthodox Syrian Church, Mar Thoma, Evangelical Church, Malankara Catholic Church and Salvation Army.

Temples
The town also has a Hindu Temple. The Hindu Temple called Cheruvallikavu Bhagavathi Temple is an old institution where Goddess Bhadrakali is the main deity...and this temple has heritage of more than 800 years.

Missionary work
Many years ago two devoted Christians, Pottakulathu Abraham Thomas (Pappy) and Karamvelimannil Daniel (Danichan) from Keekozhoor traveled to Malayalapuzha and began a Christian Missionary work. Later Elangical Philip Upadeshi joined them. They found a place in the then forest of Malayalapuzha and that is the present Malayalapuzha Mission field of the Mar Thoma Church. Pastor P.T. Abraham, Pottakulathu left home and served as the Pastor of Ceylon Pentecostal Churches in North India. He served the churches in Pune, Madras, Kohima, Delhi and Jullander. He authored many books.

See also

 Pathanamthitta
 Sabarimala
 Pune

References 

Villages in Pathanamthitta district